Alan Phillip Cohen (born October 5, 1954) is an American businessman, best known for his ownership of the Florida Panthers hockey team and his founding of several pharmaceutical companies. Cohen holds several degrees from the University of Florida.

Early life and career
Cohen made his reputation in the business world as the founder of generic pharmaceutical concerns, most notably the Davie, Florida-based Andrx Corp. Cohen, who still maintains a pharmacist's license, has been described by colleagues as an intense, driven man who prefers to stay out of the limelight, but his professional life has frequently thrust him into the headlines.

He founded the drug distribution firm Best Generics Inc. in 1984 and sold it to Florida's Ivax Corporation in 1988 for $10 million although he stayed as president until 1990. He incorporated Andrx Pharmaceuticals Inc. in 1992 as a private company. The new firm grew through the production of generic drugs when patents expired and drugs using the company's time-release technology. In 1996, the company went public at $12 and its stock eventually soared as high as $400 a share split adjusted. In August 2000, Cohen sold 500,000 shares of Andrx stock for $43 million with the stated goal of leaving the company and bankrolling the purchase of a professional sports team. Cohen's stock was worth around $700 million. He did not initially plan to leave Andrx until a successor was found to lead the firm, but he resigned that October, saying he was comfortable with the existing management. He stayed on briefly as a co-chairman of the board of directors. The company's stock fell in the years after his departure to as low as the $20-a-share range. In less than a year, Cohen said he missed the pharmaceutical business. In 2002, he created Abrika Pharmaceuticals Inc. in Sunrise, Florida, to develop and manufacture drug delivery systems such as skin patches and oral sprays. Four years later, he sold it for $235 million to Actavis Group, an international generic drug company in Iceland.

Florida Panthers
In June 2001, he led a consortium of wealthy fans in purchasing the Panthers from H. Wayne Huizenga's Boca Resorts Inc. In 2009, Cohen sold the Panthers to Cliff Viner but maintained a minority interest.

Horse racing and breeding
Since 2003, one of his hobbies has been racing and breeding horses on his Arindel Farms in Ocala, Florida. Cohen's interest was sparked in his youth accompanying his father to racetracks in New York and spending summers as a young man betting on horses at the Calder racetrack. One of his horses, Wait A While, competed in a Breeder's Cup race at Churchill Downs in 2006. She went on to become United States Champion 3 year old filly in 2006.

Personal life
He and his wife, Karen, live in Weston, Florida.

References

1954 births
Living people
Businesspeople from Florida
National Hockey League executives
National Hockey League owners
Florida Panthers owners
Place of birth missing (living people)
People from Weston, Florida
University of Florida alumni